Florence Long is an English rugby union player. She plays for Worcester Warriors Women at club level and was a member of the England squad for the 2021 Women's Six Nations Championships.

International career 
Long was named to the England squad for the 2021 Women's Six Nations Championships as one of six development players in March 2021, having previously played for the country's U20 side.

Club career 
Long currently plays for Worcester Warriors Women, having joined from Bristol Bears in 2020. In 2022, she was on short term loan to Saracens.

Early life and education 
Born in Bristol, Long played for Somerset RFU at U18 level. She supported her mother, who had breast cancer.

References 

Living people
English female rugby union players
Year of birth missing (living people)
Rugby union players from Bristol